The Disputes Tribunals Act is an Act of Parliament passed in New Zealand in 1988.

The Act replaced the Small Claims Court with the Disputes Tribunal.

References

External links
Text of the Act

Statutes of New Zealand